United Christian Academy is a private, interdenominational Christian school  for students in PreK through 12th grade. Founded in 2019, United Christian Academy was a merger of Christian Life Academy of Farmington, Minnesota, Bethany Academy and Life Academy of Bloomington.

United Christian Academy is currently located in Bloomington, Minnesota.

References

External links
 United Christian Academy

Private elementary schools in Minnesota
Private middle schools in Minnesota
Private high schools in Minnesota
Educational institutions established in 1975
High schools in Bloomington, Minnesota